Richard Tufton (1585 – 4 October 1631) was an English lawyer and politician who sat in the House of Commons at various times between 1614 and 1629.

Tufton was of Kent. He matriculated at University College, Oxford on 30 June 1598, aged 13. He was called to the bar at Gray's Inn in 1609. In 1614, he was elected member of parliament for Grantham. He was elected MP for Rye in 1628 and sat until 1629 when King Charles decided to rule without parliament for eleven years. He built Tufton Street in Westminster. Tufton is buried in Westminster Abbey, his grave marked by a memorial in white and black marble with a portrait bust below figures of Mars and Mercury.

References

 

1585 births
1631 deaths
Alumni of University College, Oxford
Burials at Westminster Abbey
English MPs 1614
English MPs 1628–1629
Members of Gray's Inn